Sequatchie is an unincorporated community in Marion County, Tennessee, United States. Its ZIP code is 37374.  The community lies in the southwestern Sequatchie Valley at the base of the Cumberland Plateau.  The Little Sequatchie River passes to the north and east of the community.  Valley View Road connects Sequatchie with Whitwell to the northeast and Jasper to the southwest.

Demographics

Notes

Unincorporated communities in Marion County, Tennessee
Unincorporated communities in Tennessee